Buellia foecunda is a lichen in the family Caliciaceae.

It was first described in 1966 by Rex Filson from a specimen found on rocks in Mac. Robertson Land (in Antarctica).

References

foecunda
Lichen species
Lichens described in 1966
Lichens of Antarctica
Taxa named by Rex Bertram Filson